Manuel Pablo García Díaz (born 25 January 1976), known as Manuel Pablo, is a Spanish retired professional footballer who played mainly as a right back, and is the assistant manager of Deportivo Fabril.

He played most of his professional career with Deportivo, appearing in nearly 450 official matches and notably winning the 1999–2000 La Liga. With stamina as his main asset, he also represented Spain on 13 occasions.

Career
Born in Arucas, Las Palmas, Canary Islands, Manuel Pablo was only 22 when he joined Deportivo de La Coruña from hometown's UD Las Palmas in the summer of 1998, being signed together with Argentine Turu Flores. He made his La Liga debut on 15 November 1998 in a 2–2 home draw against Deportivo Alavés, but faced serious competition from Armando in his first season, appearing in just 14 league matches.

Manuel Pablo played 74 games from 1999 to 2001, and was a vital part of Depors defense as the Galicians were crowned national champions in 2000 for the first time in their history. His performances earned him a debut with the Spanish national team on 16 August 2000, in a 1–4 away friendly defeat to Germany.

In his fourth season at A Coruña, disaster struck: on 30 September 2001, Manuel Pablo sustained an horrific tibia injury during the Galician derby against Celta de Vigo, in a televised match, after an unlucky tackle by Everton Giovanella.La operación de tibia de Manuel Pablo crea polémica entre los especialistas (Manuel Pablo's tibia surgery stirs up controversy amongst specialists); El Mundo, 17 November 2001  Eventually, he missed the rest of the campaign.

One year later, Manuel Pablo returned, playing the full 90 minutes against CD Corralejo in a Copa del Rey tie. On 6 October 2002 he was handed his league return by coach Javier Irureta, coming out as a late substitute in the 0–2 home loss to Racing de Santander.

In 2003–04's closing stages Manuel Pablo proved he was fully recovered, as displayed in an excellent individual display on 7 April 2004 in a 4–0 second leg quarterfinal crushing of A.C. Milan in the UEFA Champions League. From the 2004–05 season onwards, he was the undisputed right-back at Riazor (although he faced stiff competition from Álvaro Arbeloa in the 2006–07 campaign until the latter departed for Liverpool in January 2007).

In the following two seasons, Manuel Pablo remained first-choice at his position, although he was challenged by younger Laure in 2008–09. In early May 2009, after lengthy negotiations, the 33-year-old renewed his Depor contract in a 2+1 deal.

From 2009 to 2015, Manuel Pablo still managed to appear in a combined 126 league games, being relegated twice from the top flight and achieving as many promotions. On 16 June 2015, he extended his link for a further year.

On 7 July 2016, after only five competitive appearances during the season, 40-year-old Manuel Pablo retired.

Career statistics

Club

International

HonoursDeportivo'
La Liga: 1999–2000
Copa del Rey: 2001–02
Supercopa de España: 2000, 2002
Segunda División: 2011–12
UEFA Intertoto Cup: 2008

References

External links
 Deportivo official profile 
 
 
 

1976 births
Living people
People from Arucas, Las Palmas
Sportspeople from the Province of Las Palmas
Spanish footballers
Footballers from the Canary Islands
Association football defenders
Spain international footballers
Spain under-23 international footballers
Spain under-21 international footballers
La Liga players
Segunda División players
Segunda División B players
Tercera División players
UD Las Palmas Atlético players
UD Las Palmas players
Deportivo de La Coruña players